Saira Choudhry is a British actress. She is best known for portraying Saira in BBC's Life, Naila in ITV's Coronation Street and Anita Roy in Hollyoaks and Tegan in Paul Abbott's No Offence.

Early life
Saira Choudhry was born in Cheetham Hill, an inner-city area and electoral ward of Manchester, England. She was born to an Irish mother and an Indian father, the latter of whom died when Choudhry was ten years old.

Career
Choudhry first came to prominence in 2008, when she joined the cast of Hollyoaks as Anita Roy, a part she played for 198 episodes, leaving the series in 2011.

After appearing in shows such as Coronation Street and Doctors, Choudhry starred as PC Tegan Thompson in Channel 4's comedy drama series No Offence  from 2015 to 2018. On playing Tegan, Choudhry told the Manchester Evening News: "[Tegan]'s braver than me. She’s completely different to any character I’ve been known for before [...] It was nice to play such a strong female character and I think the way Paul has written her and the other women in the show is amazing. Women and men love to see that."

In 2020, Choudhry appeared as Saira Malik in the BBC drama series Life.

In 2022, Choudhry appeared as Alice in one episode of BBC comedy Peacock, alongside Allan Mustafa. Later in 2022, Choudhry starred as Nancy in the CBBC series Dodger, a reimagining of the Dickens’ character's life before Oliver Twist.

Personal life
Chaudhry's mother, Fae, is a no-smoking advisor. In 2010, Chaudhry helped to launch that year's No Smoking drive.

In 2014, Choudhry set up her own drama school, TV Talent.

Filmography

Television

References

External links 

Living people
British actresses of Indian descent
English soap opera actresses
Actresses from Manchester
People from Middleton, Greater Manchester
Year of birth missing (living people)
1982 births